Quasipenetretus is a genus of ground beetles in the family Carabidae. This genus has a single species, Quasipenetretus berezovskii, found in China.

References

Carabidae